This article lists notable alumnae of Queen's College, London, an independent girls' school, the first to award academic qualifications to women in Great Britain, and the first to receive a royal charter for that purpose.

Nineteenth century
Dorothea Beale (1848–1855), founder of Cheltenham Ladies' College & St Hilda's College, Oxford
Sophia Beale, English artist and author
Gertrude Bell (1884-1886), archaeologist and diplomat
Matilda Ellen Bishop (c. 1858–60), first Principal of Royal Holloway College
Emily Bovell, doctor, one of the 'Edinburgh Seven', and later wife of William Allen Sturge
Frances Mary Buss (1848), founder of North London Collegiate School
Dame Frances Dove (1860–62), founder of Wycombe Abbey and headmistress of St Leonard's School and St Andrews
Elizabeth Garrett Anderson, first woman to qualify as a doctor of medicine in Britain
Beatrice Harraden, writer and suffragette 
Octavia Hill, social reformer, co-founder of the National Trust, coined the term "Green Belt"
Sophia Jex-Blake (1858–61), co-founder of the London School of Medicine for Women
Adelaide Anne Procter, poet and philanthropist 
Mary Catherine Rowsell, novelist, children's author and dramatist.
Mary Gleed Tuttiett, novelist and poet known by pen-name Maxwell Gray
Mary Wardell, founder of the Convalescent Home for Scarlet Fever in Stanmore.
Frances Julia Wedgwood, feminist novelist, biographer, historian and literary critic

Twentieth century

Lesley Abdela MBE (1962), writer, author and broadcaster
Evelyn Abelson, artist
Emma Anderson (1982-3), recording artist
Peggy Appiah MBE, children's author and philanthropist
Asma al-Assad, First Lady of Syria
Miki Berenyi (1980-5), recording artist
Tania Bryer (1973–80), broadcaster
Harriet Cass (1962–70), broadcaster
Kathleen Cavendish, Marchioness of Hartington, sister of John F. Kennedy
Susannah Constantine (1978), journalist, television presenter and fashion guru
Dame Cicely Courtneidge (1905-6), actress
Eleanor Davies-Colley, first female elected to the Royal College of Surgeons
Emma Freud (1973–80), broadcaster
Penelope Gilliatt (1942-7), journalist and writer
Catherine Goodman (1972-9), painter, Artistic Director of The Prince's Drawing School
Daisy Goodwin (1972–77), BBC television producer
Rosalie Glynn Grylls, biographer, lecturer and Liberal Party politician
Nancy Hiller (1973–77) Furniture Designer and Cabinetmaker.
Sally Ann Howes (1937–38), actress
Kathryn Hunter (1968–75), actress, winner of the Olivier award, 1990
Dame Rosalinde Hurley DBE (1948–50), Professor of Microbiology, Institute of Obstetrics and Gynaecology (1975–95)
Tamara Ingram (1972–79), CEO, Saatchi & Saatchi
Jameela Jamil, television presenter
Edith Lawrence, artist
Caroline Lee-Johnson (1980–82), actress
Professor Dame Hermione Lee (1963-5), biographer and Goldsmith Professor of English Literature, Oxford, President, Wolfson College, Oxford
Sue Lees (1941–2002), academic, activist, feminist and writer
Imogen Lloyd Webber (1988–1995), author
Anthea McIntyre (1968–1973), Conservative Member of the European Parliament for the West Midlands
Katherine Mansfield (1903-6), author
Professor Albinia de la Mare OBE (1947–56), Professor of Palaeography, King's College, London
Deborah Moggach (1959–62), writer and novelist
Margaret Morris (1972-4), Dancer
Christina Onassis (1967–68), shipping magnate and daughter of Aristotle Onassis
Arabella Rosalind Hungerford Pollen (1977), fashion designer and writer
Griselda Pollock (1964-6), art historian
Jacqueline du Pré (1959), cellist
Claudia Rosencrantz (1975–79), journalist, Controller of Entertainment, ITV, Commissioner of Who Wants to Be a Millionaire?, X Factor and I'm A Celebrity, Get Me Out Of Here!, among others; Director of Programming Living TV; Director of Television, Virgin Media
Anne Said (1925–30), artist
Melissa Scott Miller (1971–77) urban landscape and portrait artist.
Gillian Sheen (1945–47), Olympic fencing gold medallist
Sofka Skipwith (Princess Sofka Dolgorouky), Russian émigré, Communist, political prisoner, recipient of British Hero of the Holocaust honour
Emma Soames (1965–67), journalist and granddaughter of Winston Churchill
Baroness Dame Mary Soames (1940), Chairman, Royal National Theatre Board; daughter of Winston Churchill
Barbara Thompson (musician) MBE (1955–62), musician
Felicity Tree, baronetess and high society figure
Kathleen Tynan (1951–55), Canadian-British journalist, author, and screenwriter
Diana Barnato Walker (1928–34), author and aviator
Vanessa Walters (1988–1995), author
Sophie Ward (1976–83), actress
Rebecca Wilcox (1992–1999), television presenter
Suzannah Walker Wise (1983–89), actress
Dame Anna Wintour  (1960–63), editor-in-chief, (American) Vogue

Twenty-First century
Peaches Geldof, television personality
Jameela Jamil, television personality

See also
Queen's College, London

References

P
Queen's College, London